Arnstorf (Central Bavarian: Oarmstorf) is a municipality in the district of Rottal-Inn in Bavaria in Germany.

Arnstorf has 151 municipal parts:

 Adermann
 Aicha
 Aign
 Aigner im Ried
 Altmannskinden
 Arnstorf
 Asbach
 Baumgarten
 Bergham
 Birchen
 Birkafeld
 Blumdorf
 Bruckbach
 Bruckmühle
 Burgerfeld
 Daimhäuseln
 Dingelsberg
 Döttenau
 Döttenberg
 Eck
 Ed
 Eiselstorf
 Falkerding
 Fernbirchen
 Freising
 Furtschneid
 Gaiswimm
 Gartenöd
 Geiersberg
 Geiselsdorf
 Gerlstetten
 Grafendorf
 Grub
 Habersbrunn
 Hafenöd
 Hag
 Hainberg
 Heißen
 Heißenhub
 Henning
 Hinterholzen
 Hinteröd
 Hochwimm
 Hödl
 Hof
 Hoheneichberg
 Holz
 Holzen
 Holzham
 Holzhäuseln
 Holzmann
 Holzweber
 Jägerndorf
 Kapfing
 Kattenberg
 Kellerhaus
 Kemathen
 Kloberg
 Knockenthal
 Kohlstorf
 Kolmöd
 Kornöd
 Kreiling
 Kroneck
 Kudlhub
 Kühbach
 Kühblei
 Kürpen
 Lampersdorf
 Langhub
 Lindach am Burgerfeld
 Loh
 Lohmann
 Mariakirchen
 Mitterhausen
 Mühlberg
 Neukirchen
 Niederlucken
 Nömer
 Oberelend
 Oberradlsbach
 Oberreut
 Oberwimpersing
 Ofen
 Padersberg
 Pauxöd
 Petersdorf
 Picklöd
 Puch
 Püchl
 Qualn
 Rabenbrunn
 Radelsbach
 Raisting
 Reisach
 Reisat
 Reitberg
 Reith
 Ried
 Ruppertskirchen
 Sägmühl
 Salksdorf
 Sattlern
 Schachten
 Schachtenmann
 Schickanöd
 Schimpfhausen
 Schleeburg
 Schlott
 Schmidhub
 Schornöd
 Schröttendorf
 Sendlmeier
 Sichenpoint
 Siegerstorf
 Siglthann
 Sommerstorf
 Speisöd
 Stadl
 Staudach
 Steindorf
 Stelzenöd
 Stierberg
 Stocka
 Stockahausen
 Thal
 Thalhausen
 Thannermann
 Thanning
 Triefelden
 Unterelend
 Unterkager
 Unterreut
 Unterschachten
 Unterwimpersing
 Volkstorf
 Wabach
 Wada
 Wadermann
 Weilnbach
 Weingarten
 Westerndorf
 Wiedmais
 Wimpersing
 Winchen
 Zachenöd
 Zankl
 Zeil
 Zeilling
 Zenzlhub
 Zwilling

References

Rottal-Inn